The 2018 All-Ireland Intermediate Hurling Championship was the 35th staging of the All-Ireland Intermediate Hurling Championship since its establishment by the Gaelic Athletic Association in 1961. The championship was held on 28 July 2018.

Kilkenny were the defending champions.

On 28 July 2018, Cork won the title following a 2-19 to 0-18 defeat of Kilkenny in the All-Ireland final at Nowlan Park. It was their ninth championship title overall and their first since 2014.

Teams

Overview

The 2018 championship saw the fewest teams participating in recent years. Both of the provincial championships in Leinster and Munster were suspended, resulting in Kilkenny and Cork being nominated to represent the respective provinces in the All-Ireland final.

Summaries

Result

All-Ireland Intermediate Hurling Championship

Final

References

Intermediate
All-Ireland Intermediate Hurling Championship